John Merriman may refer to:

John X. Merriman (1841–1926), last prime minister of the Cape Colony before the formation of the Union of South Africa in 1910
John M. Merriman (1946–2022), Yale professor of French and European history
John Merriman (athlete) (1936–1999), British Olympic athlete
John Merriman (bishop) (died 1572), Bishop of Down and Connor, 1568–72
John G. Merriman (1929–1964), Central Intelligence Agency pilot

See also
John Merriman Reynolds (1848–1933), U.S. Representative from the state of Pennsylvania